The occupation of Saint-Nizier Church by Lyon prostitutes refers to the ten-day occupation of Saint-Nizier Church in Lyon by more than a hundred prostitutes on 2 June 1975 to draw attention to their "inhumane" working conditions. The occupation lasted eight days until the women were removed by the police on 10 June. Sympathetic occupations of churches by prostitutes followed in Paris, Marseille, Grenoble, Saint-Étienne and Montpellier.

Background 
In the 1970s, French police kept prostitutes under increasing pressure. The police reprisals forced prostitutes to work increasingly in secret. As a result, protection of prostitutes decreased and led to more violence against them. In April 1975, the Lyon prostitutes started to organise themselves and their leader, "Ulla" appeared on television to publicise the women's demands. After three murders and the unwillingness of the government to improve the situation, prostitutes in Lyon took action.

Occupation
On 2 June 1975 more than 100 prostitutes occupied the Saint-Nizier church in rue de Brest and went on strike. They demanded the end of fines, police harassment and the release from jail of ten of them who had been imprison a few days earlier for soliciting. The striking workers sang political chants and demanded decent working conditions and an end to stigma.

The occupation made national headlines and was reported internationally. Local people supported the woman and brought clothes and food. The occupation received support from political, union and feminist organisations. Abolitionists, in the form of the Movement du Nid, also supported the occupation, hoping the public awareness it raised would help end prostitution.

The parish priest, the Rev. Antonin Bdal, refused to call the police to remove the women. However, acting on Government orders, the police forcibly cleared the church after eight days on 10 June. The Minister of the Interior, Michel Poniatowski, claimed the women had been manipulated into the occupation by pimps, and the Women rights Minister, Françoise Giroud, refused to meet with the women and claimed she was not competent in the matter. The leader of the Movement, "Ulla", had her real name and photograph printed in the press.

The event marks the starting point of an international movement for the International Day of Remembrance for Women Who Died in Prostitution.

Legacy

A journalist working for Libération, Claude Jaget, followed the occupation. In addition to his articles in Libération, he later published a book: Une vie de putain. This book gathers six testimonies, from among the prostitutes who participated in the occupation of the church.

In 2016, a play, Loveless, written by Anne Buffet and Yann Dacosta, an adaptation of the book, Une vie de putain, was enacted at the National Dramatic Center of Normandy-Rouen it was also staged in Lyon at the Théâtre des Célestins in 2018.

See also

 Outline of working time and conditions
 Prostitution in France
 Sex workers' rights

References

Bibliography

In media
 Les prostituées de Lyon parlent, documentary film by Carole Roussopoulos, 46 minutes, production: Video Out1, 1975 (EAN 3700301014634)
 La révolte des prostituées de Saint-Nizier, radio documentary by Eurydice Aroney and Julie Beressi for France Culture
 

1975 in France
2nd arrondissement of Lyon
Labor disputes in France
Occupations (protest)
Prostitution in France
Protests in France
Sex workers' rights